Edward J. Kempf (February 21, 1862 – December 6, 1947) was a member of the Wisconsin State Assembly.

Biography 
Kempf was born on February 21, 1862, in Sheboygan, Wisconsin. He died in Sheboygan on December 6, 1947, and was buried in the Lutheran cemetery there.

Career 
Kempf was elected to the Assembly in 1908. He was a Republican.

References 

Politicians from Sheboygan, Wisconsin
Republican Party members of the Wisconsin State Assembly
1862 births
1947 deaths